The Pertosa Caves, co-officially named Pertosa-Auletta Caves since 2012, are a karst show cave system located in the municipality of Pertosa, in the province of Salerno, Campania, Italy.

Overview
The caves, also named Grotte dell'Angelo as many Italian voids in honour of St. Michael, are extended also into the territories of Auletta and Polla.

They are situated by the eastern side of Alburni mountains, in the locality of Muraglione,  in south of Pertosa and close to its railway station. Due to the presence of Tanagro river the caves are rich of water and, after the main entrance, there is an underground lake.

Cinema
The caves were the set of some scenes of 1998 Italian horror film The Phantom of the Opera, directed by Dario Argento.

See also
Castelcivita Caves
List of caves
List of caves in Italy

References

External links

 Grotte di Pertosa-Auletta official site

Caves of Campania
Pertosa
Pertosa
Cilento
Tourist attractions in Campania
Archaeological sites in Campania